Connmhach mac Duinn Cothaid, King of Ui Fiachrach Muaidhe, died 787.

Connmhach is the earliest recorded King of Ui Fiachrach Muaidhe, and was descended from the Kings of Connacht of the Ui Fiachrach dynasty.

Uí Fiachrach Muaidhe genealogy

    Fiachnae
    |
    |
    Elgach
    |
    |
    Maeldubh
    |
    |
    Tipraite
    |
    |
    Dunchad Muirisci
    |
    |___
    |                              |                |  
    |                              |                |
    Indrechtach, d.707.            mac Dunchad      Ailill
    |                              |                | 
    |                              |                |
    Ailill Medraige, d.764.        Tipraite, d.719  Cathal
    |                                               |
    |                                               |
    Cathal, d.816.                                 Donn Cothaid mac Cathail, d.787.

References

 The History of Mayo, Hubert T. Knox, p. 379, 1908.
 Genealach Ua fFiachrach Muaidhe, 263.8 (pp. 596–97), 264.5 (pp. 598–99), Leabhar na nGenealach:The Great Book of Irish Genealogies, Dubhaltach Mac Fhirbhisigh (died 1671), eag. Nollaig Ó Muraíle, 2004–05, De Burca, Dublin.

External links
 http://www.ucc.ie/celt/published/T100005A/

People from County Mayo
8th-century Irish monarchs
787 deaths
Year of birth unknown